= Humanitarian drone =

Use of unmanned aerial vehicles

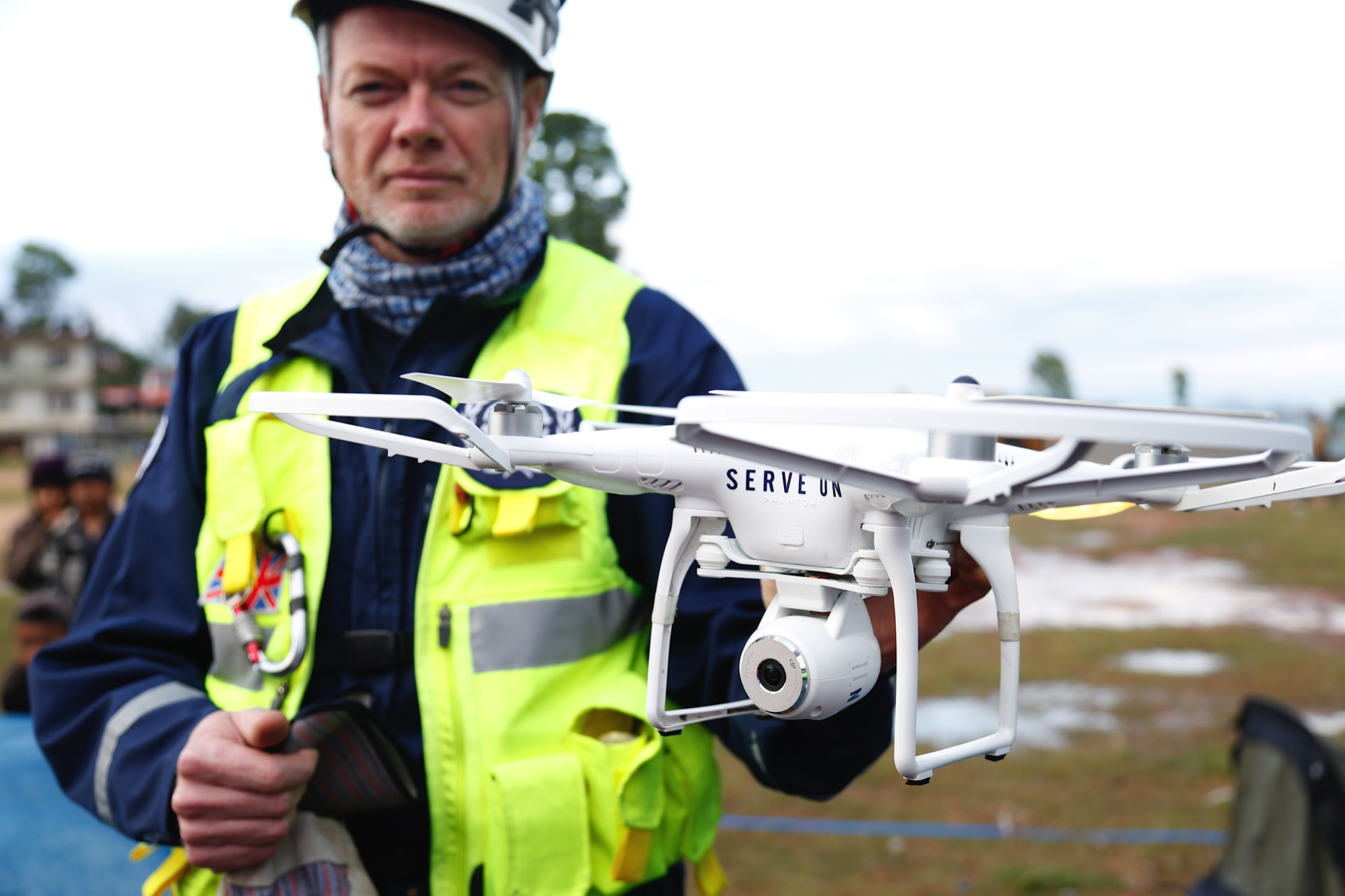
Drone surveillance helps search and rescue in Nepal

Humanitarian drone refers to the use of unmanned aerial vehicles (UAVs) for humanitarian purposes. The term is broadly used to describe the use of drones in disaster relief, search and rescue operations, medical deliveries, and environmental protection, among other applications.

In 2010, following the earthquake that struck Haiti, drones were used for the first time in a humanitarian context to help search for survivors and assess the extent of the damage. Since then, the use of drones in humanitarian settings has grown, particularly in response to natural disasters and humanitarian crises.

== Applications ==
Humanitarian drones are increasingly being used in disaster relief efforts to help search for survivors, assess the extent of the damage, and deliver aid and supplies to affected communities. In the aftermath of Hurricane Maria in Puerto Rico, drones were used to assess the damage and locate people in need of assistance. In Nepal, following the 2015 earthquake, drones were used to create 3D maps of the affected areas, which helped aid organizations in their response efforts. Drones are also used in search and rescue operations to help locate missing persons in difficult-to-reach areas. In 2017, drones were used in the aftermath of Hurricane Harvey in Texas to help locate people who were stranded by the flooding.

Drones are also being used to deliver medical supplies and equipment to remote areas where traditional transportation methods are limited or unavailable. In Rwanda, drones are being used to deliver blood and medical supplies to rural health clinics.

== Challenges ==
One of the biggest challenges is regulatory issues, as many countries have restrictions on the use of drones. Additionally, there are concerns around privacy and data protection, as well as the potential for drones to be misused, specially in the warfare context. Some other important questions about the humanitarian drones that have been address by academics, are the costs, political agendas, and ethical considerations involved in the use of drones for humanitarian purposes, and underscores the need for careful regulation and oversight of these technologies.
